The Nebraska Review was a leading American literary magazine, based at the University of Nebraska in Omaha, Nebraska. The magazine was founded in 1972 by Richard Duggan and published until 2003.

Notable contributors

John Addiego
Jacob M. Appel
Erin Belieu
Scott Boylston
Amy Knox Brown
DeWitt Henry
Peter Leach
Arthur Saltzman
James Smith
Tom Whalen

Honors and awards
Four stories that appeared in the Nebraska Review were shortlisted for the Pushcart Prize.  Other stories that appeared in the Nebraska Review were reprinted in the Best American Short Stories.

References

1972 establishments in Nebraska
2003 disestablishments in Nebraska
Defunct literary magazines published in the United States
Magazines established in 1972
Magazines disestablished in 2003
Magazines published in Nebraska
Mass media in Omaha, Nebraska
Quarterly magazines published in the United States